Mental health triage is a clinical function conducted at the point of entry to health services that aims to assess and classify the urgency of mental health related problems. Mental health triage services may be located in the Emergency Department, Community Mental Health Services, Emergency Psychiatric Center, Call Centre, or co-located with other specialist mental health services such as the Crisis Assessment and Treatment Team. Emergency Services, such as police and ambulance, may also have a co-located mental health triage service.  

There is considerable variation in the clinical settings in which mental health triage services may operate. As a consequence, service delivery models may vary. However, the essential functions remain unchanged; to determine the nature and severity of the mental health symptoms presented, determine which service response would best meet the needs of the patient, and how urgently that response is required. 

A core function of mental health triage is to conduct risk assessment that aims to determine whether the patient is at risk of harming one's self or others as a result of their mental state, and to assess other risks related to mental illness. 

As with other triage models, the mental health triage clinician must assign a category of urgency to the case, which is recorded using verbal or written indicators of risk such as 'extreme risk' through to 'low risk', or by using numerical (urgency= time-to-treatment) categories 1 (immediate) to 5 (2 hours), as per the 5-point Australasian Triage Scale.

References
Sands, N. (2007). Mental health triage: Caring for the Australian Community. Issues, 80, p35-38.
Sands, N. (2007). An ABC approach to assessing the risk of violence at triage. Australasian Emergency Nursing Journal, 10, 107-109.
Sands, N. (2007). Assessing the risk of suicide at triage. Australasian Emergency Nursing Journal. 10, 161– 163
Sands, N., Mental health triage nursing: An Australian Perspective. Journal of Psychiatric and Mental Health Nursing, 2004. 11:p 150-155.
Sands, N., (2006). Mental health triage: Toward a model for nursing practice. Journal of Psychiatric and Mental Health Nursing, 14, 243-249.
Gerdtz, M.F, J. Considine, N. Sands, D. Crellin, W. Pollock and C. Steward. (2007). Triage Education Resource Kit. Canberra.
Mental Health Triage Education University of Melbourne  https://web.archive.org/web/20081006051907/http://www.cpn.unimelb.edu.au/PDF/Mental%20Health%20Triage%20Training%20Brochure.pdf

Triage
Psychiatric assessment